Operation Koh-e-Sufaid was an operation led by Pakistani forces in the Kurram Agency in 2011. The operation took place from 4 July to 18 August 2011. The main goal of the operation was to destroy Taliban structures in the Kurram Agency and to secure the Thall-Parachinar transit route. The operation was a success for the Pakistani Army and it led to the elimination of Taliban structures in Kurram.

References 

2000s in Pakistan
2010s in Pakistan
2011 in Pakistan
Koh-e-Sufaid
Koh-e-Sufaid
Pakistan Army
Insurgency in Khyber Pakhtunkhwa
War on terror
Wars involving Pakistan
Kurram District
Battles in 2011